Beşiktaş–Galatasaray is a Turkish football rivalry involving two of the most successful clubs in the Süper Lig. It is also a local derby, one of many involving Istanbul clubs.

History

The first game played between the two sides was an Istanbul Football League game on 22 August 1924. The match, staged at Taksim Stadium, finished 2–0 to Beşiktaş. Galatasaray marked their first victory over Beşiktaş when they defeated them 6–1 in semi-final of the Istanbul Football League on 31 July 1925.

Fan's rivalry
Beşiktaş and Galatasaray are two of the most popular Turkish clubs; both sides have large fanbases that follow them in domestic and international matches. Football hooliganism is a very common phenomenon between their fans in recent years, featuring anything from breaking seats, cursing, fighting, fireworks and street rioting. Beşiktaş' fans are known for their chanting supporting and are widely known as the fiercest fans in Europe. Galatasaray's fans are also well known and are similar to Beşiktaş' fans with their chants.

Football rivalry 
Both clubs compete each other for the title of the most successful football club in Turkey. Galatasaray is the most successful of the two, having won 58 official titles compared to Beşiktaş' 35 titles and also being the most successful in their head-to-head fixtures. Galatasaray boast for their achievement to win the 2000 UEFA Cup Final and the 2000 UEFA Super Cup, being the only Turkish side to have made them so far.

Culture
Both clubs are located on the European part of Istanbul. Beşiktaş JK were founded in the municipality of Beşiktaş, while Galatasaray SK were founded in the district of Galatasaray. Both clubs naturally draw the majority of their support from the side of the city that they are native to, but maintain a significant majority of support drawn from the rest of Turkey.

Honours

Supporters
A poll involving 1.4 million people asked for the team the support in Turkey by bilyoner.com showed that alongside Galatasaray with 35%, Fenerbahçe  with 34% and Beşiktaş with 19% make up most fans.

Highest attendance

Süper Lig matches

Turkish Cup matches

Super Cup matches

Head-to-head ranking in Süper Lig

• Total: Beşiktaş with 26 higher finishes, Galatasaray with 38 higher finishes (as of the end of the 2021–22 season).

Statistics

Head-to-head
As of 05 November 2022

Biggest wins (5+ goals)

Most consecutive wins

Most consecutive draws

Most consecutive matches without a draw

Longest undefeated runs

Highest scoring matches

Most consecutive matches without conceding a goal

Most consecutive games scoring

Player

Most appearances

Top scorers

Most goals by a player in a match

Played for both teams

Players from Beşiktaş to Galatasaray
 Refik Osman Top
 Şükrü Gülesin
 Recep Adanır
 Ahmet Berman
 Ali Çoban
 Mersad Kovačević
 Saffet Sancaklı
 Sergen Yalçın
 Ayhan Akman
 Gökhan Zan
 Serdar Özkan
 Burak Yılmaz
 Cenk Gönen
 Ryan Babel
 Adem Büyük

Players from Galatasaray to Beşiktaş
 İbrahim Tusder
 Ali Soydan
 Ergun Acuner
 Suat Mamat
 Ahmet Yıldırım
 Emre Aşık
 Adrian Ilie
 Okan Buruk
 Berkant Göktan
 Mehmet Yozgatlı
 Dany Nounkeu
 Caner Erkin

Managers for both teams
 Leandro Remondini
 Gündüz Kılıç
 Karl-Heinz Feldkamp
 Mircea Lucescu
 Mustafa Denizli

See also
The Intercontinental Derby
Beşiktaş–Fenerbahçe rivalry
Major football rivalries
Beşiktaş J.K.
Galatasaray S.K.
Big Three (Turkey)

References

External links
Beşiktaş JK Website
Galatasaray SK Website

Süper Lig
Turkey football rivalries
Beşiktaş Football
Galatasaray S.K. (football)